John Forbes Hogan (January 7, 1894 – February 16, 1967) was an American architect from Providence, Rhode Island.

Hogan was born to Mary Josephine Forbes and Thomas Sebastian Hogan in Pawtucket in 1894.  In 1916 he earned a B.S. from the Massachusetts Institute of Technology, and an M.S. the following year.  For 10 months after his latter graduation he traveled in Europe.  From 1919 to 1923 he was employed as a designer in the Providence office of architect George F. Hall, the successor to the better-known firm of Martin & Hall.  In 1923 he left Hall to open his own office in Providence.  He joined the AIA in 1924.

Hogan specialized in buildings for the Catholic church, designing many churches and institutions for the diocese.

Works
Churches (Roman Catholic):
 1925 - St. Anthony, 32 Lawn Ave, Pawtucket, Rhode Island
 1932 - St. Mary, 437 Carolina Back Rd, Carolina, Rhode Island
 1935 - St. Casimir, 350 Smith St, Providence, Rhode Island
 1935 - St. Joseph, 183 Sayles Ave, Pascoag, Rhode Island
 1937 - St. Mary (Remodeling), 12 William St, Newport, Rhode Island
 1939 - St. Joseph, 1105 Main St, Hope Valley, Rhode Island
 1939 - St. Teresa, 358 Newport Ave, Pawtucket, Rhode Island
 1940 - St. Clare, 4 St Clares Way, Misquamicut, Rhode Island
 1940 - St. Edward, 396 Weeden St, Pawtucket, Rhode Island
 1947 - Our Lady of Victory, 169 Main St, Ashaway, Rhode Island
Other religious commissions:
 1928 - St. Patrick School, 244 Smith St, Providence, Rhode Island
 1928 - St. Pius School, 49 Elmhurst Ave, Providence, Rhode Island
 1932 - St. Francis House, 167 Blackstone St, Woonsocket, Rhode Island
 1939 - St. Mary Convent, 530 Broadway, Providence, Rhode Island
 1948 - Albertus Magnus Hall, Providence College, Providence, Rhode Island
 1954 - Our Lady of Fatima Hospital, 200 High Service Ave, North Providence, Rhode Island
Secular work:
 1936 - Elizabeth Barry Hall, Rhode Island State Hospital for Mental Diseases, Howard, Rhode Island
 1953 - Pastore Hall, University of Rhode Island, Kingston, Rhode Island
 1955 - Adams Residence Hall, University of Rhode Island, Kingston, Rhode Island
 1957 - Wales and Kelley Halls, University of Rhode Island, Kingston, Rhode Island

References

1894 births
1967 deaths
20th-century American architects
Architects of Roman Catholic churches
People from Pawtucket, Rhode Island
Architects from Providence, Rhode Island